This is a list of notable buildings of the Knights of Pythias, a fraternal organization.  Many of these are named, primarily or as an alternative, "Pythian Castles", and are built to resemble medieval castles, consistent with the theme of the Pythian order.

in the United States
''(by state then city or town)

References

External links

 01
Knights of Pythias buildings
Knights of Pythias